Veľké Blahovo is a village and municipality in the Dunajská Streda District in the Trnava Region of south-west Slovakia.

Until 1899 its Hungarian name was Nagy-Abony, then Nemesabony, but recently the Nagyabony form has come into usage. Its historical Slovak name was Veľké Aboň)

History
It is one of the oldest Hungarian settlements of the region. The village was first recorded in 1162 as terra Oboni. Until the end of World War I, it was part of Hungary and fell within the Dunaszerdahely district of Pozsony County. After the Austro-Hungarian army disintegrated in November 1918, Czechoslovak troops occupied the area. After the Treaty of Trianon of 1920, the village became officially part of Czechoslovakia. In November 1938, the First Vienna Award granted the area to Hungary and it was held by Hungary until 1945. The present-day municipality was formed in 1940 by unifying the three component villages. After Soviet occupation in 1945, Czechoslovak administration returned and the village became officially part of Czechoslovakia in 1947.

Demography 
In 1910, the village had 999, for the most part, Hungarian inhabitants. At the 2001 Census the recorded population of the village was 1242 while an end-2008 estimate by the Statistical Office had the villages's population also as 1242. As of 2001, 85.99% of its population were Hungarians while 10.69% were Slovaks.

Roman Catholicism is the majority religion of the village, its adherents numbering 74.32% of the total population.

Geography
The municipality lies at an altitude of 116 metres and covers an area of 18.132 km².

References

External links
Local news selection at www.parameter.hu 
Nagyabony-Velke-Blahovo | Facebook
Mestá-Obce.sk 

Villages and municipalities in Dunajská Streda District
Hungarian communities in Slovakia